Lightning Bug may refer to:

 A firefly
 Photinus (beetle)
 Photuris (genus)
 Pyractomena

Aircraft
Reflex Lightning Bug, an American kit aircraft design of the 1990s
Ryan Model 147 Lightning Bug, an unmanned aerial vehicle

Popular culture
 Lightning Bug (comics), a Marvel Comics character
 Lightning Bug (film), a 2004 horror film by writer/director Robert Hall
 Lightning Bug (novel), a 1987 novel by American author Donald Harington
 "Lightning Bug" (song), 2020 song by Dean Brody

Animal common name disambiguation pages